Thomas Kane Tulley (August 21, 1908 – April 27, 1982) was an American actor. He began his career in radio and on the stage before making his film debut in Northern Pursuit (1943). Subsequently, he was nominated for an Academy Award for his supporting role in The Caine Mutiny (1954).

In 1960, Tully was honored with a star on the Hollywood Walk of Fame for his contributions to the film industry.

Early years
Tully was born in Durango in southwestern Colorado, the son of Thomas H. Tulley and Victoria Lenore Day Tulley. He served in the United States Navy and worked as a reporter for the Denver Post in Denver, before he entered acting with the expectation of better pay.

Career

Stage 
Tully debuted on Broadway in Call Me Ziggy (1937). His other Broadway credits include The Sun Field (1942), The Strings, My Lord, Are False (1942), Jason (1942), Ah, Wilderness! (1941), The Time of Your Life (1940), Night Music (1940), The Time of Your Life (1939), The White Steed (1939), and Chalked Out (1937).

Radio 
In the era of old-time radio, Tully had the lead role of Joe in the serial Home of the Brave. He also played Jim Carroll in the serial Life Begins, Uncle Willie in the comedy My Mother's Husband, and Charles Martin in the serial Stella Dallas. He was a frequent guest actor on Gunsmoke, portraying a wide range of parts.

Film 
Tully's Hollywood film career spanned from the early 1940s until 1973. After a brief appearance in the film Carefree (1938), he next appeared in I'll Be Seeing You (1944) as the father of Shirley Temple's character.

He received an Academy Award nomination for Actor in a Supporting Role for portraying the first commander of the Caine in the 1954 drama The Caine Mutiny, with Humphrey Bogart.

His last feature film role was as a crooked gun dealer in Don Siegel's crime film Charley Varrick (1973), with Walter Matthau.

Television 
From 1954 through 1960, he played the role of police Inspector Matt Grebb on the CBS police drama, The Lineup, with co-star Warner Anderson.  In repeats, The Lineup was known as San Francisco Beat.

He made two appearances as Rob Petrie's (Dick Van Dyke) father on CBS's The Dick Van Dyke Show in 1964 and 1966. This role reunited Tully with Jerry Paris from The Caine Mutiny.
He also was a guest star on The Andy Griffith Show during the seventh season. He played Walt, the milkman in the episode, "Goodbye, Dolly."

In 1962, he appeared on the NBC modern western series, Empire in the role of Tom Cole in the episode "Long Past, Long Remembered."  Richard Jordan appeared in this episode too as Jay Bee Fowler. The series starred Richard Egan as New Mexico rancher Jim Redigo. In 1963, he was cast as Danny Mundt in "A Taste for Pineapple" of the ABC  crime drama, The Untouchables. That same year he portrayed Jethro Tate in "Who Killed Billy Jo?" on another ABC crime drama, Burke's Law, with Gene Barry.

In 1964, Tully had two appearances on CBS's Perry Mason. The first was as defendant Carey York in "The Case of the Arrogant Arsonist;" the second was as murder victim Harvey Scott in "The Case of the Nautical Knot." During the 1966 season of ABC's Shane western series, he made 17 appearances as Tom Starett. Tully also guest starred twice in the western TV series Bonanza: in the 1965 episode "The Dilemma" as Sundown Davis and in the 1967 episode "The Sure Thing" as Burt Laughlin.

Later, Tully continued his acting in television dramas such as Mission: Impossible and The Rookies.

Later years 
In November 1969, Tully traveled to South Vietnam, currently Vietnam, for the United Service Organization. His "handshake tour" took him to hospitals, radio interviews, and flight behind enemy lines, courtesy of the 173rd Airborne Brigade, to visit strategic military outposts such as the "Hawks Nest" in the Phum Valley. While in Vietnam entertaining troops, Tully contracted a filarial worm, similar to the creature that causes elephantiasis. After returning to the United States, his condition worsened. Because a blood clot in a major vein shut off circulation, his left leg was amputated close to the hip. The amputation was performed in Laguna Beach, California, close to his home in San Juan Capistrano. Complications from his surgery caused pleuritis, deafness, and serious debilitation. 

At the time of his death, Tully had completed a manuscript about his grandmother and grandfather, David F. Day, a Medal of Honor recipient in the American Civil War. Day enlisted in the army at age 14, served with the 57th Ohio Infantry, fought in the battles of Shiloh and Stones River, and was awarded the Medal of Honor for actions when he was just 16 years old. Day was the owner of the newspaper in Ouray, Colorado, formerly known as The Solid Muldoon, now the Durango Herald.

Politics
Tully refused to join the Motion Picture Alliance for the Preservation of American Ideals,   and was out of work during the Hollywood blacklist, for nine months.

Personal life 
In 1930, Tully married Helen Brown in Colorado. They had a daughter, and they were divorced on November 26, 1935. In 1938, he married actress Frances McHugh, to whom he remained wed until her death in 1953. On June 20, 1954, he married Ida Johnson in Los Angeles, and they remained married until his death.

Tully played chess by mail, was a fly-fisherman, and voiced children's books for an elementary school.

Tully died of cancer at the age of 73 on April 27, 1982 at Hoag Memorial Hospital in Newport Beach, California.

Recognition
In 1960, Tully's Hollywood Walk of Fame star, 6119 Hollywood Boulevard near Gower Street, is one of the inaugural 1,558 stars, yet misspelled as Thomas L. Tully.

Partial filmography

The Sign of the Cross (1932) – Hoboken (1944 Re-Release Prologue) (uncredited)
Mission to Moscow (1943) – American Engineer in Russia (uncredited)
Northern Pursuit (1943) – Inspector Barnett
Destination Tokyo (1943) – Mike Conners
Reward Unlimited (1944, Short) – Peggy's Father
Secret Command (1944) – Colonel Hugo Von Braun aka 'Brownie' Brownell
The Town Went Wild (1944) – Henry Harrison
I'll Be Seeing You (1944) – Mr. Marshall
The Unseen (1945) – Sullivan
Kiss and Tell (1945) – Bob Pringle
Adventure (1945) – Gus
The Virginian (1946) – Nebraska
Till the End of Time (1946) – C.W. Harper
Lady in the Lake (1946) – Capt. Kane
Intrigue (1947) – Marc Andrews
Killer McCoy (1947) – Cecil Y. Walsh
Scudda Hoo! Scudda Hay! (1948) – Robert 'Roarer' McGill
Rachel and the Stranger (1948) – Parson Jackson
June Bride (1948) – Mr. Whitman Brinker
Blood on the Moon (1948) – John Lufton
Illegal Entry (1949) – Nick Gruber
A Kiss for Corliss (1949) – Harry P. Archer
The Lady Takes a Sailor (1949) – Henry Duckworth
Where the Sidewalk Ends (1950) – Jiggs Taylor
Branded (1950) – Ransom
Tomahawk (1951) – Dan Castello
Dick Turpin's Ride (1951) – Tom King
Texas Carnival (1951) – Sheriff Jackson
Return of the Texan (1952) – Stud Spiller
Love Is Better Than Ever (1952) – Mr. Charles E. Macaboy
Lure of the Wilderness (1952) – Zack Taylor
The Turning Point (1952) – Matt Conroy
Ruby Gentry (1952) – Jud Corey
The Jazz Singer (1952) – Dan McGurney
Trouble Along the Way (1953) – Father Malone
The Moon Is Blue (1953) – Michael O'Neill
Die Jungfrau auf dem Dach (1953) – Michael O'Neill
Sea of Lost Ships (1953) – Ice Patrol Capt. Holland
Arrow in the Dust (1954) – Crowshaw
The Caine Mutiny (1954) – Lieutenant Commander William H. De Vriess
Soldier of Fortune (1955) – Tweedie
Love Me or Leave Me (1955) – Frobisher
Behind the High Wall (1956) – Warden Frank Carmichael
Ten North Frederick (1958) – Mike Slattery
The Wackiest Ship in the Army (1960) – Capt. McClung
The Carpetbaggers (1964) – Amos Winthrop
McHale's Navy Joins the Air Force (1965) – Gen. Harkness
Coogan's Bluff (1968) – Sheriff McCrea
Charley Varrick (1973) – Tom

References

External links

 Tom Tully at tcmdb
 
 

1908 births
1982 deaths
20th-century American male actors
American amputees
American male film actors
American male radio actors
American male stage actors
American male television actors
Deaths from cancer in California
Male actors from Denver
People from Durango, Colorado
People from Greater Los Angeles
United States Navy officers
Military personnel from Colorado